The term dummy variable can refer to either of the following:

 Bound variable, in mathematics and computer science, a placeholder variable
 Dummy variable (statistics), an indicator variable